Narrow tailoring (also known as narrow framing) is the legal principle that a law be written to specifically fulfill only its intended goals.

This phrase is most commonly invoked in constitutional law cases in the United States, such as First Amendment cases, or Equal Protection cases involving racial discrimination by creating racial distinctions. In the case Grutter v. Bollinger (2003), the United States Supreme Court held that:

Even in the limited circumstance when drawing racial distinctions is permissible to further a compelling state interest, government is still constrained under equal protection clause in how it may pursue that end: the means chosen to accomplish the government's asserted purpose must be specifically and narrowly framed to accomplish that purpose.

For affirmative action programs in higher education, they are only considered legal because they further the compelling state interest of creating diversity on university campuses. Federal courts would consider certain programs to be illegal if they exceeded the scope that would be required to fulfill the academic institution's goals.

See also
Strict scrutiny
Adarand Constructors, Inc. v. Peña

References 

Statutory law
United States constitutional law